Erkin is a masculine given name which is also used as a surname. People with the name include:

Given name

Erkin Abdulla (born 1978), Uyghur pop singer 
Erkin Alptekin (born 1939), Uyghur human rights activist from Germany 
Erkin Alymbekov, Kyrgyz politician
Erkin Bairam (1958–2001), Cypriot-born New Zealand economist and academic
Erkin Boydullayev (born 1984), Uzbek football player
Erkin Doniyorov (born 1990), Uzbek judoka
Erkin Gadirli (born 1972), Azerbaijani lawyer and politician
Erkin Hadımoğlu (born 1972), Turkish musical artist
Erkin Ibragimov (born 1980), Kyrgyz judoka
Erkin Koray (born 1941), Turkish musical artist
Erkin Rakishev, Kazakh film director
Erkin Shagaev (born 1959), Uzbek water polo player 
Erkin Adylbek Uulu (born 1991), Kyrgyz boxer

Surname
Behiç Erkin (1876–1961), Turkish soldier
Caner Erkin (born 1988), Turkish football player
Ferhunde Erkin (1909–2007), Turkish pianist 
Feridun Cemal Erkin (1899–1980), Turkish diplomat and politician
Sermet Erkin (born 1957), Turkish stage magician, journalist and theatre actor
Ulvi Cemal Erkin (1906–1972), Turkish composer

Turkish-language surnames
Turkish masculine given names